DeBolt is a hamlet in Alberta, Canada. DeBolt, Debolt or De Bolt may also refer to:

 Debolt, Nebraska, a community in the United States
 DeBolt Aerodrome, Alberta, Canada
 Debolt Formation, a stratigraphical unit in the Western Canadian Sedimentary Basin
 Fraser & DeBolt, a Canadian folk duo
 Rezin A. De Bolt, a U.S. Representative from Missouri
 Who Are the DeBolts? And Where Did They Get Nineteen Kids?, a 1977 documentary film about Dorothy and Bob DeBolt